Balu Naik Thanda (also known as Balu Thanda or Janu Thanda) is a village/thanda in Ranga Reddy district, Telangana, India.

Economy and education 

The traditional commerce are agriculture and trade. Lambanis are also nomadic cattle herders. and how a day people have been employed mostly in Studying  and farming.

The village has a primary school and most of the youths in thanda are literate and a few are pursuing Graduates and Post-Graduates Courses in Education and very few are employed.

References

External links
 ;– (Website)

Villages in Ranga Reddy district